Michael John Tagg (born 13 November 1946) is a British former long-distance runner. He finished second in the 10,000 metres at the 1969 European Championships.

Tagg was born in East Runton, Norfolk. He competed in the 10,000 metres at the 1968 Summer Olympics in Mexico City, finishing 13th. His sister, Mary Green, competed at the same Games. At the 1969 European Championships in Athens he won silver in the same event in 28:43.2, losing only to East Germany's Jürgen Haase; Track & Field News ranked him fourth in the world in his event that year.

Two years later in Helsinki Tagg placed seventh, setting his eventual personal best of 28:14.65; he also set his personal bests for two miles (8:28.2) and 5000 metres (13:41.4) that year.

References

1946 births
Living people
People from North Norfolk (district)
English male long-distance runners
Olympic athletes of Great Britain
Athletes (track and field) at the 1968 Summer Olympics
European Athletics Championships medalists
International Cross Country Championships winners
East Runton
Universiade medalists in athletics (track and field)
Universiade bronze medalists for Great Britain
Medalists at the 1970 Summer Universiade